Ashland Township is one of fourteen townships in Morgan County, Indiana, United States. As of the 2010 census, its population was 1,720 and it contained 694 housing units.

Geography

Unincorporated towns
 Alaska at 
 Plano at 
 Wakeland at

Cemeteries
The township contains these two cemeteries: Lingle and Ratts.

Lakes
 J Lake

School districts
 Eminence Community School Corporation

Political districts
 Indiana's 4th congressional district
 State House District 47
 State Senate District 37

References
 
 United States Census Bureau 2008 TIGER/Line Shapefiles
 IndianaMap

External links
 Indiana Township Association
 United Township Association of Indiana
 City-Data.com page for Ashland Township

Townships in Morgan County, Indiana
Townships in Indiana